Shishmaref is a city in the Nome Census Area, Alaska, United States. It is located on Sarichef Island in the Chukchi Sea, just north of the Bering Strait and five miles from the mainland. Shishmaref lies within the Bering Land Bridge National Preserve.  The population was 563 at the 2010 census, up from 562 in 2000.

Etymology
Shishmaryov is probably a variant of Russian Shyshmánov from Turkic šyšman ‘fat’, but there is also Old Russian šiš ‘rogue, knave’ and Maréev ‘(son of) marine’. The name was assigned in 1821 to a nearby inlet by explorer Otto von Kotzebue of the Russian Imperial Marine, in honor of a member of his expedition, the commander Gleb Semënovič Šišmarëv (Глеб Семёнович Шишмарёв).

In the Iñupiaq language, Qigiqtaq (formally Ḳigiḳtaḳ) means ‘island’. The water to the south of it is called Qikiqtam Imarrua ‘waters of Qikiqtaq’, shown in the map of the area in the Bering Land Bridge National Preserve.

Geography

Shishmaref was named in 1821 by explorer Lt. Otto von Kotzebue, of the Imperial Russian Navy, after Capt. Lt. Gleb Shishmaryov who accompanied him on his exploration.

Sarichef Island (on which Shishmaref is located) is part of a dynamic, 100 km-long barrier island chain that records human and environmental history spanning the past 2000 years; the oldest subaerial evidence for the formation of this system is about 1700 years before present, according to carbon 14 dating (see References, below). Erosion at Shishmaref is unique along the islands because of its fetch exposure and high tidal prism, relatively intense infrastructure development during the 20th century, and multiple shoreline defense structures built beginning in the 1970s.

Global warming 
The effect of global climate change upon Shishmaref is sometimes seen as the most dramatic in the world. Rising temperatures have resulted in a reduction in the sea ice which serves to buffer Shishmaref from storm surges. At the same time, the permafrost that the village is built on has also begun to melt, making the shore even more vulnerable to erosion. In recent years the shore has been receding at an average rate of up to 10 feet (3.3 m) per year. Although a series of barricades has been put up to protect the village, the shore has continued to erode at an alarming rate.  The Army Corps of Engineers has built a series of walls but none have been completely effective against waves.  The town's homes, water system and infrastructure are being undermined. Currently, Shishmaref has obtained funds to construct seawalls that protect some of the shoreline.

The village had plans to relocate several miles to the south, on the mainland to the Tin Creek site. However, Tin Creek proved unsuitable for long term settlement due to melting permafrost in the area. The Shishmaref Erosion and Relocation Coalition, made up of the city, the IRA Council and other organizations, is seeking federal, state and private funding for a move elsewhere.  The cost of moving Shishmaref is estimated at $180 million, nearly $320,000 per resident. The village was told by the Obama administration that no federal money was available, therefore tensions arose in 2013 when John Kerry announced Vietnam would receive $17 million to deal with climate change.

Erosion rates along the island front exceed (and are not comparable with) those along adjacent sectors. Erosion is occurring along the entire island chain, but it is exacerbated at Sarichef Island in part because of the hydrographic impacts of hard armoring of a sandy shoreface and permafrost degradation that is accelerated by infrastructure. Residents are experiencing the effects of coastal retreat on residential and commercial properties.

Residents voted on town relocation several times, as early as 1975 and then in 2002 which approved it. On August 16, 2016, the village voted to move the town to the mainland. The town's residents prefer to think of the move to the mainland as an "expansion" rather than a "relocation", but although a site on the mainland called West Tin-Creek Hills was selected in 2016, there’s still a lot of planning and research to be done before that can be determined viable.

Culture

Sometimes referred to as "the friendliest village in Alaska," Shishmaref is an Iñupiaq village. Researchers, journalists and the occasional tourist visit Shishmaref, and the city has acquired a reputation for being a gracious host.

Residents rely heavily on a subsistence lifestyle, that is, hunting and gathering much of their food. Primary food sources include sea mammals such as oogruk (bearded seal), other seals, and walrus, fish, birds (such as ptarmigan), caribou and moose. The village is well known in the region for its high-quality seal oil and fermented meat.

Shishmaref is known for its Native art. Local artists carve sculptures from whalebone and walrus ivory, that are much sought after by galleries in Alaska and the Lower 48 states. George Aden Ahgupuk (1911–2001), a prominent Iñupiaq sculptor and draftsman lived in Shishmaref.

Shishmaref was home to one of Alaska's most-beloved dog mushers. Herbie Nayokpuk (1929–2006), known as the "Shishmaref Cannonball," finished the Iditarod Trail Sled Dog Race numerous times, including a second-place finish.

Demographics

Shishmaref first appeared on the 1920 U.S. Census as an unincorporated village. It formally incorporated in 1969.

As of the census of 2000, there were 562 people, 142 households, and 110 families residing in the city. The racial makeup of the city was 93.24% Native American (mainly Inupiat), 5.34% White, and 1.42% from two or more races. Hispanic or Latino of any race were 0.53% of the population.

Of the 142 households, 52.8% had children under the age of 18 living with them, 36.6% were married couples living together, 19.7% had a female householder with no husband present, and 22.5% were non-families. 21.1% of all households were made up of individuals, and 4.2% had someone living alone who was 65 years of age or older.  The average household size was 3.96 and the average family size was 4.59.

In the city, the population was spread out, with 40.9% under the age of 18, 11.4% from 18 to 24, 29.4% from 25 to 44, 12.6% from 45 to 64, and 5.7% who were 65 years of age or older.  The median age was 24 years. For every 100 females, there were 125.7 males.  For every 100 females age 18 and over, there were 121.3 males.

The median income for a household in the city was $30,714, and the median income for a family was $29,306. Males had a median income of $35,357 versus $25,000 for females. The per capita income for the city was $10,487.  About 16.2% of families and 16.3% of the population were below the poverty line, including 21.2% of those under age 18 and 10.5% of those age 65 or over.

Education
Shishmaref is served by the Bering Strait School District. Shishmaref School is the only school in town and serves grades Pre-K through 12 with a population of 183 students and 33 pre-school children. There are 19 teachers at Shishmaref School and is the largest and newest building in settlement.

Transportation

There are three main roads, Main Street-Airport Road, Housing Trail and Clinic Road. Roads are not paved but have street lighting and do not connect to the outside beyond Shishmaref. Vehicles are mostly ATVs with a few private vehicles and dirt motorcycles.

Some residents will travel by wood vessels around Sarichef Island and a barge delivers goods and materials to Shishmaref when it is ice free.

Shishmaref Airport is the only means of connecting the town to the rest of Alaska. The airport replaced an earlier airport which is now occupied by housing near the lagoon.

Housing

Houses in Shishmaref are pre-fabricated and mostly single story. Construction material is mostly wood board and sometimes metal. The homes are often damaged from erosion.

Local businesses and other places of interest

Government
 US Post Office 
 New Airport 
 City Offices
 Shishmaref School

Business
 Shishmaref Native Store 
 Nayokpuk General Store  
 Washeteria 
 Tannery

Services
 Friendship Center  
 Bingo Hall - near Main Street and Clinic Road
 Shishmaref Lutheran Church and Cemetery
 IRA Building
 Bulk Fuel Tank - city owned
etc

Services

Local healthcare services are provided by the Katherine Miksruag Olanna Health Clinic, a member of the Norton Sound Health Corporation (NSHC) based in Nome, AK. Certified health aides provide general services including lab work, vaccinations, health screenings, and treatment of acute health issues. The clinic utilizes NSHC's electronic medical record system, as well as other modern technologies including video teleconferencing and remote medication dispensing, in order to provide quality care to its patients. Healthcare providers of various specialties also routinely visit the clinic to provide additional services, screenings, and chronic disease state management.

Policing is provided by Shishmaref Police Department and fire services are provided by Shishmaref Volunteer Fire Department.

References

External links

 The History of Shishmaref
 Arctic Change: Village of Shishmaref, North Alaska, NOAA
 "Moving the Village" - an audio documentary about Shishmaref and Climate Change
 
 
 A Dutch multimediaproject in progress on the consequences of climate change to the social life of the villagers
 

Chukchi Sea
Cities in Alaska
Cities in Nome Census Area, Alaska
Populated coastal places in Alaska on the Arctic Ocean
Populated places in the Seward Peninsula
Managed retreat